The 2015 Atlantic Sun Conference baseball tournament was at Swanson Stadium on the campus of Florida Gulf Coast University in Fort Myers, Florida, from May 20 through 23.   won their second tournament title and claimed the Atlantic Sun Conference's automatic bid to the 2015 NCAA Division I baseball tournament.

Format and seeding
The 2015 tournament will be a double-elimination tournament in which the top six conference finishers will participate.  For the first time, Northern Kentucky was eligible for the event, despite not fully completing its reclassification from Division II. However, the Norse failed to qualify for the tournament.

Bracket and results
{{6Team2ElimA
| RD1=First round
| RD2=Second round
| RD3=Quarterfinals
| RD4=Semifinals
| RD5=Finals

| RD1-seed1=1
| RD1-team1=
| RD1-score1=14
| RD1-seed2=6
| RD1-team2=
| RD1-score2=0

| RD1-seed3=2
| RD1-team3=
| RD1-score3=2
| RD1-seed4=5
| RD1-team4=
| RD1-score4=1

| RD1-seed5=3
| RD1-team5= 
| RD1-score5=8*
| RD1-seed6=4
| RD1-team6=
| RD1-score6=7

| RD2-seed1=1
| RD2-team1=North Florida
| RD2-score1=8
| RD2-seed2=4
| RD2-team2=Jacksonville
| RD2-score2=3

| RD2-seed3=2
| RD2-team3=Lipscomb
| RD2-score3=9
| RD2-seed4=3
| RD2-team4=Stetson
| RD2-score4=5

| RD2-seed5=6
| RD2-team5=Kennesaw State
| RD2-score5=2
| RD2-seed6=5
| RD2-team6=Florida Gulf Coast
| RD2-score6=6

| RD3-seed1=1
| RD3-team1=North Florida
| RD3-score1=1
| RD3-seed2=2
| RD3-team2=Lipscomb
| RD3-score2=2

| RD3-seed3=3
| RD3-team3=Stetson
| RD3-score3=2
| RD3-seed4=5
| RD3-team4=Florida Gulf Coast
| RD3-score4=3

| RD4-seed1=1
| RD4-team1=North Florida
| RD4-score1=8
| RD4-seed2=5
| RD4-team2=Florida Gulf Coast
| RD4-score2=2

| RD5-seed1=2
| RD5-team1=Lipscomb
| RD5-score1a=8
| RD5-score1b=–
| RD5-seed2=1
| RD5-team2=North Florida 
| RD5-score2a=7
| RD5-score2b=–
}}

All-Tournament Team
The following players were named to the All-Tournament Team.

Most Valuable PlayerJonathan Allison''' was named Tournament Most Valuable Player.  The senior outfielder for Lipscomb recorded six hits and four RBI over four games.

References

ASUN Conference Baseball Tournament
Tournament
Atlantic Sun Conference baseball tournament
Atlantic Sun baseball tournament
College baseball tournaments in Florida
Baseball competitions in Fort Myers, Florida